Jesús Castro Aguirre (16 October 1908 - unknown) was a Mexican amateur footballer  who played as a forward. He played his club football for Club América and was an unused member of the Mexico squad for the 1930 World Cup.

References

External links

Date of death missing
Association football forwards
Mexican footballers
Mexico international footballers
1930 FIFA World Cup players
Club América footballers
1908 births